Tennis was contested at the 1974 Asian Games in Imperial Country Club Tehran, Iran. the competition took held from 2 September to 13 September 1974.

Tennis had doubles and singles events for men and women, as well as a mixed doubles competition.

Medalists

Medal table

See also
 Tennis at the Asian Games

References

 Asian Games Roll of Honour (1962-2006)

External links
 OCA website

 
1974 Asian Games events
1974
Asian Games
1974 Asian Games